699 Hela is a Mars crossing asteroid. It was discovered on 5 June 1910 at Heidelberg by German astronomer Joseph Helffrich, and may have been named after Hel, the Norse ruler of the underworld. The orbital plane is inclined at an angle of 15.3° to the plane of the ecliptic.

With an absolute magnitude of 11.7, the asteroid is about 12–27 km in diameter. It is classified as a stony Sk or Sq-type asteroid in the SMASS taxonomy. The lightcurve inversion method was used to build a shape model with a rounded form and an equatorial bulge.

References

External links 
 Lightcurve plot of 699 Hela, Palmer Divide Observatory, B. D. Warner (1999)
 Asteroid Lightcurve Database (LCDB), query form (info )
 Dictionary of Minor Planet Names, Google books
 Asteroids and comets rotation curves, CdR – Observatoire de Genève, Raoul Behrend
 Discovery Circumstances: Numbered Minor Planets (1)-(5000) – Minor Planet Center
 
 

Mars-crossing asteroids
Hela
Hela
S-type asteroids (Tholen)
Sq-type asteroids (SMASS)
19100605